The Pallanganmiddang, otherwise known as the  Waywurru, were an Indigenous Australian people of North-eastern Victoria, in the state of Victoria, Australia. Recent scholarship has suggested that In Norman Tindale's classic study his references to a Djilamatang tribe and their language arguably refer in good part to the Pallanganmiddang (or Dhudhuroa)

Name
-midhang/-middang occurs as an ethnonym-marking suffix attached to several tribal and clan names in the area. It may be the equivalent of the more southerly Kulin term –, "mouth/speech". A. W. Howitt's map of the area refers to a Balaung Karar group, where Balaung may be an echo of Pallang- in the Pallanganmiddang ethnonym.

Language

Pallanganmiddang is classified by R. M. Dixon as one of two members of the Upper Murray Group, the other being Dhudhuroa. It was probably spoken by people inhabiting the area the northwest of the Dhudhuroa, though the overlap of vocabulary between the two languages appears to be low, about 10.7% A vocabulary of 46 words with the title "Pallanganmiddah" was provided by Thomas Mitchell, a resident of Tangambalanga, as early as 1878. A.W.Howitt first asserted that their language was "utterly different" from that of surrounding peoples, and modern research has confirmed that it lacked any close affinity with the other languages of that area.

Country
Robert Smyth's 1878 map located a PallunganMiddah group southeast of Wodonga, in the area of Tangambalanga about the terrain of the northern Kiewa River and Tallangatta around the Mitta Mitta River. Howitt's mention of a Balaung Karar group to the south-west of Wodonga has been taken, by Barry Blake, as a reference to (Balaung/Pallungan) to the same people.

Society
The Pallanganmiddang, in part at least, appear to have adopted the Kulin patrimoiety system with its eaglehawk –crow moieties. This division, meaning that names were inherited through the father rather than the mother was a characteristic of Central Victorian Aboriginal culture, but deviated from the general norm in South-East Australia.
Diane Barwick identified at least two clans, who used the Kulin terms rather than the corresponding Pallanganmiddang terminology to denote their respective moieties, a fact that suggests they intermarried with the contiguous southern and western Kulin groups.
  in the Mount Buffalo area, forming an eaglehawk moiety
 ' in the district of Wangaratta, constituting a crow moiety.

History of contact

Some words
 dog
 crow
 crayfish
 wild dog
 white man
 eaglehawk

Notes

Citations

Sources

Aboriginal peoples of Victoria (Australia)
History of Victoria (Australia)